Series 4 could refer to:

 Aston Martin Lagonda Series 4, the automobile model
 BMW 4 Series, the automobile model line
 GeForce 4 series, line of nVidia video cards
 Scania 4-series, the truck model line
 South African Class 6E1, Series 4, electric locomotive series
 Series 4, the registered options principal exam

See also
 400 series (disambiguation)
 System 4 (disambiguation)